Dacnis is a genus of Neotropical birds in the tanager family Thraupidae.

These are highly sexually dichromatic species with bright blue males and green females. They have various bill types and many of them feed on nectar.

Taxonomy and species list
The genus Dacnis was introduced in 1816 by the French naturalist Georges Cuvier with the blue dacnis as the type species. The name is from the Ancient Greek daknis, an unidentified bird from Egypt listed by Hesychius of Alexandria and Sextus Pompeius Festus. This genus is placed together with the genera Tesina and Cyanerpes in the subfamily Dacninae.

The genus contains ten species:

References

 
Bird genera
Taxa named by Georges Cuvier